The National Healthcare Group (NHG) is a group of healthcare institutions in Singapore. The group was formed in 2000 and operates several hospitals, national specialty centres, and polyclinics. Tan Tock Seng Hospital is the largest hospital in the group and serves as the flagship hospital for the cluster.

History 

In November 1999, then-Minister for Health Lim Hng Kiang announced that Singapore's public healthcare institutions would be reorganised into two delivery networks, or clusters. In October 2000, the formation of the two clusters - National Healthcare Group and SingHealth - were officially completed. NHG offers health care service which is reachable and continuous, economical, and wide-ranging. The core values of the National health care group are that its people-centric, ethical, and responsible as well as have empathy toward the community and its members.

Organisation

Healthcare institutions

Tan Tock Seng Hospital 

Tan Tock Seng Hospital (TTSH) was established in 1844 and named after its founder, Mr Tan Tock Seng, a philanthropist. Over the years, TTSH became Singapore's second largest acute care general hospital with over 1,500 beds. It is located in Novena, Singapore and its campus includes the National Centre for Infectious Diseases, Ng Teng Fong Centre for Healthcare Innovation and two National Specialty Centres.

Yishun Health Campus 

Khoo Teck Puat Hospital (KTPH) is a 795-bed general hospital in Yishun that was opened in 2010, while the Yishun Community Hospital (YCH) is a 428-bed community hospital that was opened in 2015. Both hospitals are grouped together as a regional health campus called Yishun Health Campus.

Institute of Mental Health 

The Institute of Mental Health is the first and only psychiatric hospital in Singapore. It was founded in 1928, starting with some 1,000 patients. This was the first mental hospital in Singapore. Departments include clinical psychology, nursing, occupational therapy, and medical social work. As of 2015, it is a 2,000-bed acute tertiary psychiatric hospital situated on a 25-hectare campus at Buangkok Green Medical Park. It conducts psychiatric, rehabilitative and counselling services for children, adolescents, adults, and the elderly. There are 50 wards for inpatients and seven Specialist Outpatient Clinics. It is also a national training centre for psychiatrists and mental health professionals.

National Healthcare Group Polyclinics 
National Healthcare Group Polyclinics is the primary healthcare arm of the NHG. It has seven polyclinics in the central and northern parts of Singapore. They provide treatment for acute medical conditions, management of chronic diseases, women and child health services and dental care, health promotion, early and accurate diagnosis, and disease management through physician led team-based care as well as enhancing the capability of Family Medicine through research and teaching.

National Skin Centre 

The National Skin Centre (NSC) is an outpatient specialist dermatology centre located in the Tan Tock Seng Hospital Novena campus. It handles a patient load of about 1,000 patients daily. Incorporated on 9 June 1988, it started operations on 1 November 1988 after taking over the treatment of skin diseases from Middle Road Hospital. It provides specialised dermatological services, trains medical students and postgraduates, and undertakes research in dermatology. The centre also conducts continuing medical education for doctors and paramedical personnel.

Other institutions 
Apart from the provision of healthcare through healthcare institutions, the NHG also operates several other divisions in other areas such as education and ancillary health services.

NHG College 
National Healthcare Group College was established on 19 July 2002 to educate, train and raise the professionalism of NHG staff. It is structured into four institutes, namely the Institute of Healthcare Leadership, Institute of Clinical Education, Institute of Healthcare Quality and the Institute of Professional Training.

NHG Diagnostics 
NHG Diagnostics was founded in 2000. It provides laboratory and imaging services in primary healthcare via its extensive network of over 30 imaging centres, laboratories and a fleet of mobile service vehicles in Singapore. Its diagnostic services at polyclinics, community hospitals, general practitioner clinics, nursing homes, home care providers and the community include general X-ray, mammography, ultrasound, electrocardiography, bone mineral densitometry, spirometry, phlebotomy and laboratory testing. All its laboratories and radiography centres are accredited with ISO 15189. It also provides teleradiology reporting and professional services in managing radiology and laboratory clinics.

NHG Pharmacy 
NHG Pharmacy manages the pharmacy and retail pharmacies at the nine polyclinics and in retail centres, and also provides medication management services to intermediate and long term care facilities. The pharmacies also provide smoking cessation clinics, anti-coagulation clinics, and hypertension-diabetes-lipidaemia clinics led by pharmacists to control chronic diseases. NHG Pharmacy also allows patients to refill their prescriptions online, and choose to have their uncollected medicines delivered to them, or collected from a designated polyclinic.

Primary Care Academy 
Established in April 2007, the Primary Care Academy provides training and skills upgrading for primary care doctors, nurses, allied health professionals and ancillary staff.

NHG-Johns Hopkins Singapore Institute 
NHG-Johns Hopkins Singapore Institute is a co-branded venture between NHG and Johns Hopkins Medicine International that provides oncology services in Singapore.

See also
 National University Health System
 SingHealth

References

External links
Official website

2000 establishments in Singapore
Singaporean companies established in 2000
Medical and health organisations based in Singapore
Health care companies established in 2000